Universal Airlines may refer to one of the following defunct airlines:

Universal Air Lines Corporation, 1928–1934
Universal Airlines (United States), 1966–1972
Universal Airlines (Guyana), 2001–2005

See also
Air Universal, 2002–2007